is a former Japanese football player and manager. He managed Japan women's national team.

Coaching career
In June 1981, the Japan Football Association formed the first Japan women's national team for the 1981 AFC Women's Championship in Hong Kong. The Japan Football Association appointed Ichihara as the first Japan national team manager.  The first match of this tournament was on June 7, and Japan played against Chinese Taipei. This match was the Japan team's first match in an International A Match. However, Japan lost this match (0–1) and its second match, against Thailand (0–2), on June 11. The third match, against Indonesia, was on June 13, and Japan won 1–0 with Etsuko Handa's goal. This was the Japan team's first victory.

In September, the team played two matches in Japan. However, they lost in both games, against England (0–4) and Italy (0–9). The match against Italy was the greatest loss in the history of the Japan national team.

Result

References

Year of birth missing (living people)
Living people
Japanese footballers
Japanese football managers
Japan women's national football team managers
Association footballers not categorized by position